Schneeball was a German record label founded in 1976.

Embryo, Missus Beastly, Sparifankal, Ton Steine Scherben and Julius Schittenhelm decided to take their fate into their own hands in 1976. Setting themselves apart from the phonograph industry, they founded their own record company (APRIL Records) and cooperatively organized the distribution. “Music distributed by the musicians” was the primary guiding principle.
 
There were no European models to imitate, although the Filmverlag der Autoren [Authors’ Film Publishing Company] was surely groundbreaking at the beginning. Established several years previously, it had succeeded in marginally pushing back the market power of the Anglo-American media flood so the filmmakers who belonged to it could make a living for themselves.
 
The start of APRIL Records was extraordinarily successful and attracted much attention. After CBS threatened to take legal action, its name was changed to “Schneeball” [“Snowball”] in 1977. The situation was quite difficult, but samplers entitled “April ist Schneeball” [“April is Snowball”] enabled it to remain recognizable in the music and media landscapes. The name was chosen to express the energy in the center of the music spectrum and the expansion and development along its margins. Many others subsequently used APRIL Records as a model. Within a short time, numerous bands wanted to be part of it. Other artists who published at Schneeball are Real Ax Band, Munju, Checkpoint Charlie, Moira, and Hammerfest. An important cooperating partner for distribution via bookstores was the Trikont label “Unsere Stimme” [“Our Voice”], which had sprouted from Trikont Buchverlag [Trikont Book Publishing Company]. At the same time, the “Umsonst und draußen” [“Free and Outdoors”] festival movement developed as an organizational form for noncommercial music festivals. New labels were founded, including, for example, NO FUN, Zickzack, Eigelstein, Subup, and Trikont.
 
The distribution was taken over by EfA(Energie für Alle) [Energy for Everyone] at the beginning of the 1980s. Schneeball Oper 1 und 2 [Snowball Operas 1 and 2] were developed as a new cooperative project by the musicians from the various bands. This showed that a mutual willingness existed to collaborate beyond the horizons of each individual band.
The distribution structure became increasingly independent, but this autonomy unfortunately proved detrimental to the interests of the producing artists. Consequently, Efa and INDIGO Musikvertrieb [INDIGO Music Distribution] separated in 1992.

Schneeball’s most productive era was already over by the mid 1980s. The reasons were manifold. Ton Stein Scherben broke up. Rio Reiser began a solo career at Sony. At EMBRYO too, many years of collaboration among the musicians and composers Christian Burchard, Roman Bunka and Uve Müllrich came to an end after a trip to India – but not before the releases of the double LP “EMBRYO’s Reise” [“EMBRYO’s Trip”], a road movie, and a music documentary film “Vagabundenkarawane” [“Caravan of Vagabonds”] by Werner Penzel and Nico Humpert.

EMBRYO’s dissidents hived off, joined forces with Hartmut Bremer, and co-founded the EXIL [EXILE] label, likewise at INDIGO. Christian Burchard formed EMBRYO anew with different personnel. Sparifankal switched to a new label and a new distributor. A great die-off of the pioneering German bands began, and no one wept to see the trailblazers disappear. Punk, Neue deutsche Welle, disco: the audience’s orientations had changed.

Othmar Schreckeneder, EMBRYO’s producer since 1972, continued to publish audio recordings until the mid 1990s on the Schneeball label with EMBRYO and its guest musicians from diverse cultures and countries. He also published radio plays for Bayerischer Rundfunk [Bavarian Radio] (Ernst Jandl, Grace Yoon) and works by artists such as Eugen de Ryck, Chris Karrer, and Amon Düül II.

EMBRYO switched to Trikont, thus remaining under Indigo’s distribution. Only Schreckeneder continued to use the label for occasional new releases, e.g. Charlie Mariano with Rama Mani in 2005 or Peter Michael Hamel with Thomas Gundermann in 2014.

Schneeball was the trailblazer of the “Independent Label” movement, which conquered its place in the global music industry.

First issues of April/Schneeball 
 (0000) : Sparifankal - Bayernrock
 (0001) : Missus Beastly - Dr. Aftershave And The Mixed Pickles
 (0002) : Ton Steine Scherben - Wenn die Nacht am tiefsten ...
 (0003) : Embryo - Live
 (0004) : Julius Schittenhelm - Aristoteles
 (0005) : Embryo - Bad Heads And Bad Cats
 (0006) : Brühwarm Theater / Ton Steine Scherben - Mannstoll
 (0007) : Ton Steine Scherben - Keine Macht für Niemand
 (0008) : Ton Steine Scherben - Warum geht es mir so dreckig?
 (0009) : The Real Ax Band - nicht stehen bleiben, move your ass in time
 (0010) : Embryo - Apo Calypso
 (0011) : Missus Beastly - Space Guerrillia
 (0013) : APRIL ist SCHNEEBALL // sampler
 (0018) : Sparifankal - Huraxdax Drudnhax
 (0020) : Embryo - Embryo's Reise
 (0021) : Julius Schittenheim - Müllmutanten
 (0023) : Embryo - Live
 (2012) : Munju - Highspeed Kindergarten
 (2014) : Moira - Crazy Count Down
 (2015) : Checkpoint Charlie - Frühling, der Krüppel
 [2017) : Munju - Moon You
 (2019) : Checkpoint Charly - Die Durchsichtige
 (2022) : Munju - Brot & Spiele
 (2024) : Checkpoint Charly - Kravall im Schweinestall
 (3025) : Hammerfest - Hier bei uns
 (3026) : Hammerfest - Schleudertest
 (12-1035): Hammerfest - Dezente Elemente
 (ST-HFOO 1) : Hammerfest - An einem schönen Tag in Mai / Wir jagen diese Irren aus unserem Land
 (ASS1) : Elastic Rock Band - Faruks Traum
 (ASS3) : Unsonst und Draussen (sampler Vlotho' 76
 (ASS5) : Embryo - Anthology
 (ASS9) : Gebärväterli - In Tal der Emmen
 (MC-1) Dissident of Embryo  (Compact Cassette)
 (nnnn) = historical distribution number
 additional : three live samplers : Vlotho - umsonst und draussen 1975 / 1976 / 1977
 (LC 5372) : Hammerfest - Schöne Grüße aus Hammerfest (first Schneeball CD (1991))

See also 
 List of record labels

External links
 Official site
 Schneeball at Discogs
 April at Discogs

German independent record labels
Record labels established in 1976
1976 establishments in West Germany